Issikiopteryx japonica is a moth in the family Lecithoceridae. It is found in Japan.

References

Moths described in 1973
Issikiopteryx
Moths of Japan